The .303/22, sometimes known as the .22/303, is a wildcat centrefire rifle cartridge based on the .303 British, necked down to fire a .224 projectile, originating in Australia in the 1930s as a cartridge for sporterised rifles, particularly on the Lee–Enfield action.  Similar versions also appeared in Canada around the same time.

The .303/22 was very popular for a number of reasons, one being that the .22 caliber was better suited to small game than the .303, the rifles were cheap and plentiful, and in New South Wales ownership of military cartridges was severely restricted. Several versions existed, including the full length Falcon, the shortened Sprinter, the even shorter Wasp, the Varmint-R, and many others. Although Lee–Enfields were the most common, conversion of other rifles mostly suited to rimmed cartridges such as P14 Enfield, Martini–Enfield, 1885 and 1895 Winchesters were often seen, as well as 98 and 96 Mausers.

Loaded ammunition and brass was produced by the Super Cartridge Company, Riverbrand, ICI and Sportco, some using new Boxer primed cases, others using military Berdan primed cases. Cases can be formed simply by necking down .303 British brass available from Remington, Federal, Winchester, Sellier & Bellot and others. Reloading dies are made by most larger manufacturers, like RCBS, CH and Simplex.

Variants

303/22 Wasp 1.97",  303/22 Varment R. 2.031", 303/22 Sprinter 2.100", 303/22 2.185", 303/22 Shannon 2.222", 303/22 Rocket (aka. 22/4000) unknown case length.

See also
.22-06
.303/25
Lee–Enfield
List of rifle cartridges
Sporterising

References

22 303
Wildcat cartridges